Dehumanizer is the sixteenth studio album by English rock band Black Sabbath, released on June 22, 1992.

It was Sabbath's first studio album in over a decade to feature vocalist Ronnie James Dio and drummer Vinny Appice, and their first in nine years to feature original bassist Geezer Butler. Initial writing and demo sessions at Rich Bitch Studios in Birmingham featured drummer Cozy Powell; bootlegs of these sessions exist. However, when Powell became injured with a broken hip, he was replaced with Appice. With Appice back in the band, this effectively reunited the Mob Rules lineup. The band spent two weeks writing material before spending six weeks rehearsing and recording demos at Monnow Valley Studios in Wales.

The album's lineup – Dio, Appice, Butler and guitarist Tony Iommi – reunited in 2006 for a greatest hits set, Black Sabbath: The Dio Years, and a new studio album in 2009, The Devil You Know (billed as Heaven & Hell).

The album was re-released, with bonus content, on 7 February 2011.

Overview
Lyrically and musically, Dehumanizer is considered one of Sabbath's heaviest albums. Lyrical themes vary from a computer worshipped as a god (Computer God), to televangelists (TV Crimes), to individualism (I) and doubts about the afterlife (After All (The Dead)).

The album was recorded in Wales, at Rockfield Studios. It was intended to feature Cozy Powell, then Sabbath's drummer, but he was immobilised by a broken pelvic bone sustained in a horse riding accident. Dio initially wanted to replace Powell with Simon Wright, from AC/DC and his own band, but Butler and Iommi rejected him. They instead recruited Vinny Appice, who had served as Sabbath's drummer during most of Dio's previous tenure with the band, from 1980–1982.

During sessions for the album, Tony Martin made a short comeback when invited by the band to try the songs out. He stayed for just a couple of days and the band continued with Dio. Martin stated: "I had already started my first solo album Back Where I Belong – so, when I got the call to go back, I was committed by that point. And in fact it was just a couple of months after they had started the thing with Ronnie James Dio. I was determined to finish my solo thing and so turned them down at that point. We did keep in touch though and I went to some shows. Ronnie wasn't too pleased, but eventually they had enough and asked me to rejoin again later so it felt like I hadn't actually left. In fact, I was never formally fired; the phone just stopped ringing. Ian Gillan [vocalist for Deep Purple, and another ex-Sabbath singer] asked me once if I had actually been fired and I said, 'No.' He said, 'Neither have I.' We should just turn up one day and walk on stage!"

Demo sessions with Powell yielded numerous recordings, including two unreleased songs – "The Night Life" (also called "Next Time"), whose riff was later used for "Psychophobia" on Cross Purposes, and "Bad Blood," which sounds very similar to "I" on Dehumanizer. These songs can be found, along with other demos and untitled songs, on the Complete Dehumanizer Sessions bootleg.  "Computer God" was the title of an unreleased song by The Geezer Butler Band, in 1986 – only the title made it to Dehumanizer. The Butler version is available as a download on his website. "Master of Insanity" was also an unreleased Geezer Butler Band track, of which the Dehumanizer version is essentially a rerecording. "Master of Insanity" was the only track on Dehumanizer that Dio did not have a hand in writing the lyrics. Jimi Bell, the guitarist with Butler's band actually wrote the song. Geezer promised a credit and payment, but Jimi never was paid or credited for his contributions. The album's lead single, "TV Crimes," was a criticism of American televangelists, particularly Jeff Fenholt, who briefly worked with Iommi in the mid-1980s on what would become Seventh Star.

"We wanted it to be real rock 'n' roll: real basic," Dio told WERS' Nasty Habits show. "We wanted to capture what we are live and that's really what I think we did. We didn't do tons of overdubs or a lot of chorusy kind of things. I think the important thing is that a band should be able to do all the things they do on record live, without any kind of sampling crap or that rubbish – so, of course, we didn't. We recorded it true to what the band is: just guitar, bass, drums and vocals, y'know – a couple of keyboard things here and there."

Although the Sabbath lineup was the same as 1981's Mob Rules, the musical direction is very different, and a marked change from their previous material, particularly the preceding Tyr. Much of the album anticipates the directions taken by Dio in his eponymous solo band's next two records, Strange Highways (1993) and Angry Machines (1996). Commercially, the album marked a resurgence for Sabbath. It reached the Top 40 in the UK, and peaked at number 44 on the Billboard 200 chart.

Aftermath
"It was good to try that with Ronnie," Iommi reflected in 1997. "[But] we lost millions on it... because of the time we took to record it, and fly backwards and forwards to the States with everything, all the gear; bringing it back; recording here [the UK]... A lot of messing about and a lot of money wasted... If it came to it again now, we could plan it different and it'd be okay, but we had to try that. Originally Cozy was involved, then he wasn't."

This incarnation of Sabbath ended when Dio's contract with the band ended several days before the Costa Mesa reunion shows in November 1992. According to Iommi, Dio quit because he was asked to support Ozzy Osbourne's final shows at Costa Mesa, referring to Ozzy as a "clown." Dio would not record or perform with the band again until 2006. For the two Costa Mesa shows, the band replaced Dio with Judas Priest frontman Rob Halford; on the second night, Iommi, Butler and original Sabbath drummer Bill Ward joined Osbourne onstage for four songs. Halford and Dio were friends (Dio having been impressed with Halford's work ethic on the 'Stars' project) and Halford would only do the Costa Mesa shows with Dio's blessing, which he received when he spoke with Dio by phone. Both shows were unofficially recorded in their entirety and are now widely circulated as audio and video bootlegs.

Dehumanizer is included in the Black Sabbath box set The Rules of Hell.

Dehumanizer was rereleased on 7 February 2011. This version includes a bonus disc with alternate recordings of several songs ("Master of Insanity," "Letters from Earth" and "Time Machine," the latter of which is available on the US version of the album as a bonus track) and several other songs recorded on 25 July 1992 in Tampa, Florida.

In 2021, Kerrang! ranked Dehumanizer as the eighth-best Black Sabbath album in a best-to-worst ranking of the band's discography.

Track listing

Personnel
Info taken from Dehumanizer liner notes
Black Sabbath
Ronnie James Dio – vocals
Tony Iommi – guitars
Geezer Butler – bass
Vinny Appice – drums
Geoff Nicholls – keyboards
Production
Produced, engineered, and mixed by Mack
"Time Machine" (Wayne's World Version) produced by Black Sabbath
Assistant engineers – Darren Galer and Stephen Wissnet
Remastered by Dan Hersch (2008 reissue)
Remastered by Andy Pearce (2011 reissue)
Cover illustration – Wil Rees
Photography – Mark "Weissguy" Weiss

Charts

Album

Singles

Release history

References

External links
 

1992 albums
Black Sabbath albums
Albums produced by Reinhold Mack
I.R.S. Records albums
Reprise Records albums
Albums recorded at Rockfield Studios